Aaron Stuart James Bentley (born 8 November 1995) is an English footballer who plays as a central defender for Plymouth Parkway.

Career
Bentley joined Plymouth Argyle's youth setup relatively late in 2010, after playing for local youth club Tamerton Foliot FC, ran by his father Chris. He signed a one-year professional deal in June 2014, being promoted to the main squad.

On 20 December 2014 Bentley made his professional debut, starting in a 3–0 home win against Dagenham & Redbridge for the League Two club.

Just days later on 28 December 2014, with it only being his 3rd professional start, he was red-carded for a tackle on Josh Ruffels whilst playing against Oxford United.

On 20 February 2015, Alfreton Town signed Bentley on a one-month long loan before being released from Plymouth on 15 January 2016 and then joining Truro City in February 2016.

On 1 June 2017, Aaron joined ambitious South West Peninsula League Premier side Plymouth Parkway as they sought to get promoted to the Western Football League for 2018–19.

On 15 February 2019, Bentley joined his former club Truro City. On 28 March 2019, Plymouth Parkway announced, that Bentley had returned to the club after only one month.

On 1 June 2020 he signed for Southern League Premier Division side Taunton Town.

On 26 August 2020 Bentley signed for Western League Premier Division side Tavistock A.F.C. in order to guarantee more game time.

Personal life
Aaron is the older brother of Plymouth Argyle defender Jordan Bentley.

References

External links

1995 births
Living people
Footballers from Plymouth, Devon
English footballers
Association football defenders
Plymouth Argyle F.C. players
Alfreton Town F.C. players
English Football League players
Truro City F.C. players